Rice is a surname that is frequently of Welsh origin, but also can be Irish, English, or even German. In Wales it is a patronymic surname, an Anglicized transliteration of Rhys, as are Reese and Reece. The German name Reiss has also been transliterated as Rice in the United States.

A
Abbott Barnes Rice (1862–1926), businessman and Massachusetts state legislator
Albert E. Rice (1845–1921), U.S. politician, Lt. Governor of Minnesota
Alex Rice (born 1972), Canadian First Nations actress
Alexander H. Rice (1818–1895), U.S. politician, Governor of Massachusetts
Alexander H. Rice Jr. (1875–1956), U.S. geographer and explorer
Alice Hegan Rice (1870–1942), U.S. novelist
Alice May Bates Rice (1868 – after 1907), American singer
Americus Vespucius Rice (1835–1904), U.S. Civil War general (Union) and U.S. Congressman
Amy Rice (born 1966), U.S. Rhode Island state politician
Andrew Rice (born 1973), Oklahoma state senator
Andrew E. Rice (1922–2010), Founder of Peace Corps and Society for International Development
Anna Rice (born 1980), Canadian badminton player
Anne Rice (1941–2021), U.S. author of Gothic and religious themed novels
Anneka Rice (born 1958), British television presenter
Arthur Rice, 6th Baron Dynevor (1836–1911)
Ashley Rice (born 1986), English actor

B
Benjamin F. Rice (1828–1905), U.S. Republican Senator from Arkansas
Benjamin L. Rice (1837–1927), epigraphist in India
Boyd Rice (born 1956), U.S. experimental sound/noise musician, also known as NON
Brett Rice (born 1954), American actor
Britton Rice (born 1981), American musician and record producer
Bryan Rice (born 1978), Danish singer also known as Brian Risberg Clausen
Buddy Rice (born 1976), U.S. auto racing driver

C
Cale Young Rice (1872–1943), U.S. poet and dramatist
Caleb Rice (1792–1873), attorney and politician who was first president of the Massachusetts Mutual Life Insurance Company
Cecil Spring Rice (1872–1943) British diplomat.
C. Allen Thorndike Rice (1851–1889), publisher, editor and journalist
Charles E. Rice (1931–2015), U.S. legal scholar, Catholic apologist, and author 
Charles Owen Rice (1908–2005), U.S. labor activist, Roman Catholic priest
Chester Williams Rice (1888–1951), U.S. inventor
Chris Rice, U.S. singer and songwriter of contemporary and Christian music
Christopher Rice (born 1978), U.S. novelist, son of Anne Rice
Clive Rice (1949–2015), South African cricketer
Condoleezza Rice (born 1954), U.S. academic and public official, former Secretary of State
Constance L. Rice (born 1956), U.S. civil rights activist
Craig L. Rice, (born 1972), U.S. politician from Maryland
Craig Rice (author) (1908–1957), U.S. author of mysteries

D
Damien Rice (born 1973), Irish musician
Dan Rice (1823–1900), U.S. entertainer, primarily a clown
Danica Rice, Canadian sprint kayaker
David Rice (disambiguation), multiple people
Dean Rice (born 1968), Australian rules footballer
Declan Rice (born 1999), English footballer
Del Rice (1922–1983), U.S. baseball player and team manager, American League
Desmond Rice (1924–2020), British Army officer
Donna Rice (born 1958), figure in U.S. political sex scandal, anti-pornography crusader
Dorothy P. Rice (1922–2017), U.S. public health statistician

E
Ed Rice (1918–2001), U.S. author, publisher, photojournalist and painter
Edmund Ignatius Rice (1762–1844), Irish Roman Catholic missionary, founder of Christian Brothers and Presentation Brothers
Edmund Rice (colonist) (1594–1663), early Massachusetts Bay settler who has many descendants in the northern U.S.A.
Edmund Rice (general) (1842–1906), brigadier general, American Civil War Medal of Honor recipient
Edmund Rice (politician) (1819–1889), U.S. Congressman from Minnesota
Edward A. Rice Jr. (born 1956), U.S. Air Force Lt. General
Edward E. Rice (1847–1924), writer in U.S. theater
Edward Loranus Rice (1871–1960), U.S. biologist and educator
Edward Y. Rice (1820–1883), U.S. representative from Illinois
Elizabeth Rice (born 1985), U.S. actress
Elliott Warren Rice (1835–1887), U.S. Civil War general (Union)
Elmer Rice (1892–1967), U.S. Pulitzer Prize winning playwright
Eugene Rice (1891–1967), U.S. federal judge
Eugene F. Rice Jr. (1924–2008), U.S. historian

F
Florence Rice (1911–1974), U.S. film actress of the 1930s and early 1940s
Florence M. Rice (1919–2020), New York City consumer advocate
Francis Rice, 5th Baron Dynevor (1804–1878)
Franklin Pierce Rice (1852–1919) publisher, historian and antiquarian
Fredrick Rice (born 1996) vocal teacher, piano player

G
Gary Rice (born 1960), former British cricketer
George Rice, 3rd Baron Dynevor (1765–1852)
George Rice-Trevor, 4th Baron Dynevor (1795–1869)
George W. Rice (photographer), (1855–1884) Canadian photographer and arctic explorer
George W. Rice (businessman) (1823–1856), U.S. businessman known for founding the Massachusetts Mutual Life Insurance Company
Gigi Rice (born 1965), U.S. movie and television actress
Glen Rice (born 1967), U.S. professional basketball player
Glen Rice Jr. (born 1967), U.S. and international professional basketball player
Gordon Rice (born 1933), Canadian artist
Grantland Rice (1880–1954), U.S. sportswriter

H
Harvey Rice, (1800–1891) lawyer, publisher, author and Ohio state legislator
Helen Steiner Rice (1900–1981), U.S. writer of religious poetry
Henry Rice (politician), (1786–1867) U.S. military officer, merchant and Massachusetts state legislator
Henry Gordon Rice (1920–2003), U.S. logician known for Rice's theorem
Henry Mower Rice  (1816–1894), U.S. Senator from Minnesota
Homer Rice (born 1927), American football coach
Horace Rice (1872–1950), Australian tennis player
Howard Rice, U.S. sailor

I
Ignatius Rice (1883–1955) headmaster of Douai School in England
Isaac Rice (1850–1915), U.S. inventor and chess player

J
J Rice (born 1988), American singer songwriter
Jackie Rice (born 1990), Filipina actress and model
Jacob Rice (New Hampshire politician) (1787–1879), New Hampshire politician
Jacob Rice (New York politician) (1847–1930), New York politician
James A. Rice (born 1957), U.S. politician and jurist
James Clay Rice (1828–1864), U.S. Civil War general (Union)
James Louis Rice (1730—1793), Irish count of The Holy Roman Empire
James Mahmud Rice (born 1972), Australian sociologist
James Montgomery Rice (1842–1912), American lawyer and politician
James R. Rice, (born 1940), U.S. scholar in the field of solid mechanics
James S. Rice, (1846–1939), U.S. rancher and businessman
James Rice (cricketer), English amateur cricketer from 1811 to 1813
James Rice (writer) (1843–1882), English novelist
Jerry Rice Jr. (born 1991) American football player
Jerry Rice, (born 1962), American football player
Jim Rice (born 1953), former U.S. baseball player
Joan Rice (1930–1997), British movie actress
Joel Ryce-Menuhin (1933–1998), or Joel Taylor Rice, pianist and Jungian psychologist
John Rice (disambiguation), multiple people
Johnathan Rice (born 1983), U.S. musician
Jonas Rice (1672–1753), founder of Worcester, Massachusetts
Joseph Waldo Rice (1828–1915) American-born entrepreneur and Australia pioneer
Juanita Rice (née Anita Rice, also known as Juanita Guccione; 1904–1999), American painter and taxidermist

K
 Kathleen M. Rice (born 1965), U.S Congresswoman representing New York's 4th congressional district

L
L. Scott Rice (born 1958), U.S. Air Force major general
Laban Lacy Rice (1870–1973), U.S. educator
Landon Rice (born 1988), Canadian football player
Larry Rice (1946–2009), U.S. racing car driver
Len Rice (1918–1992), U.S. baseball player
Lilian Jeannette Rice (1889–1938), American architect
Linda L. Rice (born 1964), American racehorse trainer
Lucy Wilson Rice (1874–1963), American artist based in Texas
Luther Rice (1783–1836), U.S. minister and missionary

M
Mack Rice (1933–2016), U.S. songwriter
Mandy Rice-Davies (1944–2014) British model involved in the Profumo affair
Marjorie Rice (1923–2017), U.S. amateur mathematician
Matthew Rice (born 1982), American football player
Michael Rice (disambiguation) or Mike Rice, multiple people
Milton P. Rice (1920–2018), American lawyer
Miriam C. Rice (1918–2010), American artist
Monty Rice (born 1999), American football player

N
Nathaniel Rice (c. 1694 – 1753), colonial governor of North Carolina
Norm Rice (born 1943), former mayor of Seattle, Washington

P
Pat Rice (born 1949), Northern Irish footballer and coach
Paul Rice (born 1949), Australian District Court Judge
Paul North Rice (1888–1967) American librarian
Percy Fitch Rice, (1882–1954) inventor and businessman
Peter Rice (1935–1992), Irish structural engineer

R
Rachel Rice (born 1984), Welsh actress and model
Rashee Rice (born 2000), American football player
Ray Rice (born 1955), U.S. Professional Kickboxing Champion and Martial Arts Instructor
Ray Rice (born 1987), American football player
Rice Brothers John and Greg, (born 1951) U.S. identical twin dwarfs, actors in commercials
Richard Rice (disambiguation), multiple people
Robert V. Rice (1924–2020), U.S. biochemist
Ronald Rice (born 1945) U.S. New Jersey state politician

S
Sam Rice (Edgar Charles "Sam" Rice), (1890–1974) U.S. baseball player
Samuel Allen Rice (1828–1864), U.S. Civil war general (Union)
Santino Rice (born 1974), U.S. fashion designer
Sarah Rice, U.S. stage actress
Sidney Rice (born 1986), American football player
Simeon Rice (born 1974), American football player
Spencer Rice (born 1973), Canadian writer and comedian
Stan Rice (1942–2002), U.S. poet and artist, husband of Anne Rice
Stephanie Rice (born 1988), Australian swimmer
Steven Rice (born 1971), 1990s National Hockey League player from Canada
Stuart A. Rice (born 1932), U.S. theoretical and physical chemist
Susan Rice (born 1964), U.S. foreign policy advisor and ambassador to the United Nations
Suzy Rice, U.S. screenwriter and graphic artist

T
Terry Rice (born 1954), member of the Arkansas House of Representatives
Thomas Rice (disambiguation), multiple people
Tim Rice (born 1944), British lyricist, worked with Andrew Lloyd Webber
Tim Rice-Oxley (born 1976), English musician, co-founder of Keane
Tony Rice (gridiron football) (born 1967), American football player
Tony Rice (1951–2020) U.S. bluegrass musician
Tom Rice (born 1957) U.S. Congressman (South Carolina's 7th congressional district, Republican Party)
Travis Rice (born 1982) U.S. professional snowboarder

V
Victor M. Rice (1818–1869), New York politician

W
W. Thomas Rice (1912–2006), American railroad executive
Wallace Rice (1859–1939), U.S. author, lecturer, and poet
Walter Rice, 7th Baron Dynevor (1873–1956)
Willard Rice (1895–1967), American silver medalist in 1924 Winter Olympics
William B. Rice (1840–1909), American industrialist and corporate executive
William "Bill" Rice (1931–2006), American artist, writer, actor, and director
William Craig Rice (1955–2016), American pedagogy expert
William Hyde Rice (1846–1924), sugar plantation owner and politician from Kauai, Hawaii
William Marsh Rice (1816–1900), American businessman, founder of Rice University
William North Rice (1845–1928), American geologist
William W. Rice (1826–1896), U.S. Representative from Massachusetts

Fictional characters
 Chlöe Rice, a character in the Netflix series 13 Reasons Why

Notes

See also
Justice Rice (disambiguation)

Surnames
English-language surnames
Anglicised Welsh-language surnames